Al-Bukiryah Club Stadium is a multi-use stadium in Al Bukayriyah, Saudi Arabia. It is currently used mostly for football matches, on club level by Al-Bukiryah FC.

Construction
Construction began in 1986 with a proposed cost of 99,500,000 SAR. The stadium finally opened its doors in 1988.

Previous name(s)
This stadium was previously known as Al-Amal Club Stadium and was changed following the change of the club name to Al-Bukiryah FC.

References

Football venues in Saudi Arabia